Sick Cylinders is a 1929 animated short film by Winkler Productions which stars Oswald the Lucky Rabbit. It is among the few surviving Oswald films from the Winkler era.

Plot
Oswald is driving his uncovered car through the countryside. One day, he stops by a two-story house to pick up his date, a girl cat. When both are on board, they attempt to hit the road. To their surprise, the car breaks down. Oswald steps out to fix the vehicle while the girl cat impatiently waits.

While Oswald is fixing it, a terrier comes by, wanting to play fetch. Every time the rabbit hurls a stick, the terrier comes back with a bigger one. This goes on until the terrier returns with a huge log, dropping it on the car's front as well as flattening Oswald underneath. Tired of playing games, Oswald kicks away the little mutt and resumes working on the car.

In no time, the car is repaired and ready to go. Oswald and the girl cat finally set off. However, their journey is far from a smooth one because they have to dodge large rocks on the way which they do successfully. But more trouble comes as the two riders see a boulder rolling toward them from behind. Finding no way to escape, they run off a cliff where they plunge into a pond, splashing out all the water.

In the dry pit which is what is left of the pond, the car is capsized. Oswald and his date are lying on the ground. The girl cat then stands up and expresses her disgust. Momentarily, a boy dog in a luxuriant car stops by. The boy dog invites the girl cat, who is most flattered, to come along. She then takes a seat and the luxuriant car then departs. Oswald is left behind, frustrated, and battering his own vehicle.

References in later works
There are sequences which were later remade very closely in such Harman and Ising Warner Bros. efforts as Sinkin' in the Bathtub (1930) and Bosko's Holiday (1931).

See also
Oswald the Lucky Rabbit filmography

References

External links
Sick Cylinders at the Big Cartoon Database
Of Rocks and Socks: The Winkler Oswalds (1928-29)

1929 films
1929 animated films
1920s American animated films
1920s animated short films
American black-and-white films
Films directed by Ben Clopton
Films directed by Hugh Harman
Oswald the Lucky Rabbit cartoons
Universal Pictures animated short films
Universal Pictures short films
Animated films about animals
Screen Gems short films